Jonathan Neo Darnell Garvin (born July 28, 1999) is an American football outside linebacker for the Green Bay Packers of the National Football League (NFL). He played college football at Miami.

College career
In 2018, Garvin tallied 60 tackles, 17 tackles for loss, 5.5 sacks, two fumble recoveries, five pass breakups, and a touchdown on a fumble return in 13 starts for the University of Miami. During his junior season, his production declined due to the emergence of defensive end Gregory Rousseau. Garvin had 26 tackles for loss and 10.5 sacks in his sophomore and junior seasons at Miami. In the regular season finale of his senior year against Duke, Garvin tallied a game-high 10 tackles, two sacks, 3 1/2 tackles for loss and a forced fumble.

After his junior season, he decided to forgo his senior season and enter the 2020 NFL Draft.

Professional career

Garvin was selected by the Green Bay Packers in the seventh round with the 242nd overall pick in the 2020 NFL Draft. He was signed on May 26, 2020. On November 24, 2021, he was placed on reserve/COVID-19 list. He was activated on December 4.

NFL career statistics

Regular season

References

External links
Green Bay Packers bio
Miami Hurricanes bio

Living people
1999 births
People from Lake Worth Beach, Florida
Players of American football from Florida
Sportspeople from the Miami metropolitan area
American football defensive ends
Miami Hurricanes football players
Green Bay Packers players